Carabina is a subtribe of carab beetles, in the tribe Carabini.

References

External links 
 

Carabinae
Insect subtribes